The 2005 Southern Conference men's basketball tournament took place from March 2–5, 2005 at the McKenzie Arena in Chattanooga, Tennessee. The #2 seed Chattanooga Mocs defeated the UNC Greensboro Spartans in the championship game to win their ninth title in school history and receive the automatic berth to the 2005 NCAA tournament.

Format
All twelve teams were eligible for the tournament. The tournament used a preset bracket consisting of four rounds, the first of which featured four games, with the winners moving on to the quarterfinal round. The top four teams in the tournament received first round byes, and the division winners were seeded first and second overall. This was the last season for East Tennessee State as a member of the conference.

Bracket

* Overtime game

See also
List of Southern Conference men's basketball champions

References

Tournament
Southern Conference men's basketball tournament
Southern Conference men's basketball tournament
Southern Conference men's basketball tournament
Sports competitions in Chattanooga, Tennessee
College sports tournaments in Tennessee
Basketball competitions in Tennessee